Al-Najaf Sports Club is an Iraqi professional football club based in Najaf. They are members of the Iraqi Premier League. Al-Najaf has competed in the 2007 AFC Champions League.

History
In 1960, the city of Najaf began an active movement to establish a sports club after the athletes then felt the need of the city to a sports club that absorbed the energies of young people and their creations which are almost lost in the amateur leagues. Some of the dignitaries of the city were contacted for this purpose. The request was submitted to the Ministry of the Interior, which was responsible for the authorisation of sports clubs in Iraq at that time. The name of Al Ghiri Sports Club was proposed for this institution.
In 1961, the Ministry of the Interior approved their request to establish the club and thus wrote the birth certificate of the first sports club in the city of Najaf and consisted of the first administrative body of Messrs. Naji Hassan Hasswa as president and Maki Hadi Maala Vice-President and Alwan Elsafer as secretary. 
At the beginning of the establishment of the club, the Ministry of the Interior allocated an annual grant of 60 dinars divided into two instalments, and the club relied on this grant and monthly subscriptions from its members.

Stadiums
New Najaf Stadium is a purpose built football stadium that is the current home stadium of Al-Najaf. It opened in 2018, with a capacity of 30,000 people. Until 2018, the club played its home matches at An-Najaf Stadium.

Current squad

First-team squad

Current technical staff

{| class="toccolours"
!bgcolor=silver|Position
!bgcolor=silver|Name
!bgcolor=silver|Nationality
|- bgcolor=#eeeeee
|Coach:||Haidar Aboodi||
|- 
|Assistant coach:||Dhiyya Falih||
|-
|-bgcolor=#eeeeee
|Goalkeeping coach:||Mohammed Abdul-Zahra||
|-
|Fitness coach:||Salah Hashim||
|-
|Team supervisor:||Fadhel Mohammed||
|-bgcolor=#eeeeee
|-
|Team manager:||Mohammed Abdul Hussein||
|-bgcolor=#eeeeee
|Team Doctor:||Haitham Abdul Amir||
|-
|U-19 Coach:||Haider Lafta||
|-

Managerial history
Since the club's promotion to the Iraqi Premier League in the 1987–88 season so far, twenty-six coaches have led the team:

  Mohammed Hussein Ismail 
  Alwan Mena 
  Nasrat Nasser 
  Mohammed Hussein Ismail 
  Alwan Mena 
  Hatif Shamran 
  Alwan Mena 
  Najeh Humoud 
  Wathiq Naji 
  Hatif Shamran 
  Noman Kadhim & Raheem Jassim 
  Najeh Humoud 
  Hadi Mutanish 
  Ali Kadhim 
  Abdul Ghani Shahad 
  Najeh Humoud 
  Abdul Ghani Shahad 
  Hatif Shamran 
  Majed Najem 
  Abdul Ghani Shahad 
  Hatif Shamran 
  Abdul Ghani Shahad 
  Yahya Alwan 
  Hassan Ahmed 
  Qahtan Chathir 
  Salman Hussein 
  Haider Yahya 
  Hatif Shamran 
  Haider Yahya 
  Hameed Salman 
  Ali Wahab 
  Emad Mohammed 
  Hatif Shamran 
  Emad Mohammed 
  Nadhim Shaker 
  Ali Hashim 
  Ahmed Khalef 
  Mudhafar Jabbar 
  Thair Jassam 
  Chasib Sultan 
  Hassan Ahmad 
  Haidar Aboodi 
  Hatif Shamran 
  Haidar Aboodi

Honours

Domestic
Iraqi Premier League
Runners-up (3): 1995–96, 2005–06, 2008–09
Iraqi Elite Cup
Winners (1): 1997

Friendly
Victory and Peace Championship
Winners (1): 1992
Love Championship
Winners (1): 2003

Performance in AFC Competitions
AFC Champions League: 1 appearance
2007: Group stage

Statistics

In domestic competitions

See also
 Iraqi clubs in the AFC Champions League
 2007–08 Arab Champions League

References

External links
 Official Website (Arabic)
 Club Page On Kooora

1961 establishments in Iraq
Najaf
Association football clubs established in 1961
Football clubs in Najaf